The year 2012 was the 3rd year in the history of the Road Fighting Championship, an MMA promotion based in South Korea. 2012 started with Road FC 006: Final 4 and ended with Road FC 010: In Busan.

List of events

Road FC 010: In Busan 

Road FC 010: In Busan was an MMA event held by the Road FC on November 24, 2012 at the Auditorium, BEXCO in Busan, South Korea.

Results

Road FC 009: Beat Down 

Road FC 009: Beat Down was an MMA event held by the Road FC on September 15, 2012 at the Wonju Chiak Gymnasium in Wonju, Gangwon, South Korea.

Results

Road FC 008: Final 4 Bitter Rivals 

Road FC 008: Final 4 Bitter Rivals was an MMA event held by the Road FC on June 16, 2012 at the Wonju Chiak Gymnasium in Wonju, Gangwon, South Korea.

Results

Tournament Pair Assignment for selecting the first Champion in Road FC Bantamweight Division

Road FC 007: Recharged 

Road FC 007: Recharged was an MMA event held by the Road FC on March 24, 2012 at the Jangchung Gymnasium in Seoul, South Korea.

Results

Road FC 006: Final 4 

 ROAD FC 006: Final 4 was an MMA event held by the Road FC on February 5, 2012 at the Jangchung Gymnasium in Seoul, South Korea.

Results

Tournament Pair Assignment for selecting the first Champion in Road FC Middleweight Division

See also
 List of Road FC events
 List of Road FC champions
 List of current Road FC fighters
 List of current mixed martial arts champions

References 

Road Fighting Championship events
2012 in mixed martial arts
2012 in South Korean sport
2012 in Asian sport